Camptoprosopella is a genus of flies in the family Lauxaniidae. There are more than 30 described species in Camptoprosopella.

Species
Camptoprosopella acuticornis Shewell, 1939
Camptoprosopella angulata Shewell, 1939
Camptoprosopella antennalis (Fitch, 1856)
Camptoprosopella atra Malloch, 1926
Camptoprosopella borealis Shewell, 1939
Camptoprosopella cincta (Loew, 1861)
Camptoprosopella confusa Shewell, 1939
Camptoprosopella cruda Shewell, 1939
Camptoprosopella cubana Shewell, 1939
Camptoprosopella decolor Shewell, 1939
Camptoprosopella diversa Curran, 1926
Camptoprosopella dolorosa (Williston, 1903)
Camptoprosopella equatorialis Shewell, 1939
Camptoprosopella flavipalpis Malloch, 1926
Camptoprosopella gracilis Shewell, 1939
Camptoprosopella hera Shewell, 1939
Camptoprosopella imitatrix Shewell, 1939
Camptoprosopella latipunctata Malloch, 1926
Camptoprosopella longisetosa Shewell, 1939
Camptoprosopella maculipennis Malloch, 1923
Camptoprosopella mallochi Shewell, 1939
Camptoprosopella media Shewell, 1939
Camptoprosopella nigra Malloch, 1933
Camptoprosopella ocellaris (Townsend, 1892)
Camptoprosopella pallidicornis Shewell, 1939
Camptoprosopella plumata (Wulp, 1867)
Camptoprosopella resinosa (Wiedemann, 1830)
Camptoprosopella setipalpis Shewell, 1939
Camptoprosopella slossonae Shewell, 1939
Camptoprosopella texana Shewell, 1939
Camptoprosopella varia Shewell, 1939
Camptoprosopella verticalis (Loew, 1861)
Camptoprosopella vulgaris (Fitch, 1856)
Camptoprosopella xanthoptera Hendel, 1907

References

Further reading

External links

 

Lauxaniidae
Articles created by Qbugbot
Schizophora genera